Michael Philip Pratt (born 10 February 1948) is a former Australian politician. A member of the Liberal Party, he was elected to the House of Representatives at the 1988 Adelaide by-election. He served until his defeat at the 1990 federal election.

Early life
Pratt was born on 10 February 1948 in Blyth, South Australia. Prior to entering politics he worked as a farmer and from 1984 as a marketing executive with the Norwood Football Club. He joined the Burra branch of the Young Liberals in 1970.

Parliament
Pratt was elected to the House of Representatives at the 1988 Adelaide by-election, which followed the resignation of the incumbent Australian Labor Party (ALP) member Chris Hurford to take up a diplomatic post. In parliament he served on the standing committee on the Parliamentary Library. He was defeated for re-election at the 1990 federal election by the ALP candidate Bob Catley.

Later activities
In 1992, Pratt announced that he would contest the Division of Sturt at the next federal election as an independent. This brought him into conflict with Senator Amanda Vanstone, who alleged that he had never intended to win the seat of Adelaide and was in fact using the by-election as a "dummy run" for the state seat of Norwood.

Pratt later returned to the Liberal Party and supported Vickie Chapman's bid for the state leadership. In 2013, it was reported that he was handing out brochures for independent senator Nick Xenophon. He operated a Liberal Party campaign bus during the 2019 federal election.

His daughter, Penny Pratt was elected as the Liberal member for Frome at the 2022 South Australian state election.

References

1948 births
Living people
Liberal Party of Australia members of the Parliament of Australia
Members of the Australian House of Representatives for Adelaide
Members of the Australian House of Representatives
20th-century Australian politicians